Josef Koudelka (born 10 January 1938) is a Czech-French photographer. He is a member of Magnum Photos and has won awards such as the Prix Nadar (1978), a Grand Prix National de la Photographie (1989), a Grand Prix Henri Cartier-Bresson (1991), and the Hasselblad Foundation International Award in Photography (1992). Exhibitions of his work have been held at the Museum of Modern Art and the International Center of Photography, New York; the Hayward Gallery, London; the Stedelijk Museum Amsterdam; and the Palais de Tokyo, Paris.

Biography
Koudelka was born in 1938 in the small Moravian town of Boskovice, Czechoslovakia. He began photographing his family and the surroundings with a 6×6 Bakelite camera. He studied at the Czech Technical University in Prague (ČVUT) in 1956, receiving a degree in engineering in 1961. He staged his first photographic exhibition the same year. Later he worked as an aeronautical engineer in Prague and Bratislava.

Koudelka began taking commissions from theatre magazines, and regularly photographed stage productions at Prague's Theatre Behind the Gate on a Rolleiflex camera. In 1967, he decided to give up his career in engineering for full-time work as a photographer.

Between 1962 and 1971, Koudelka travelled throughout Czechoslovakia and rural Romania, Hungary, France and Spain photographing Romani people. The Romani led a nomadic lifestyle and each summer Koudelka would travel for the project, "carrying a rucksack and a sleeping bag, sleeping in the open air, and living frugally".

He had returned from photographing Romani people in Romania just two days before the Soviet invasion, in August 1968. He witnessed and recorded the military forces of the Warsaw Pact as they invaded Prague and crushed reforms of the so-called Prague Spring. Some of Koudelka's negatives were smuggled out of Prague to the Magnum Photos agency, and published anonymously in The Sunday Times Magazine under the initials P. P. (Prague Photographer) for fear of reprisal to him and his family.

Koudelka's pictures of the events became dramatic international symbols, and came to be "recognised as one of the most powerful photojournalistic essays of the 20th century". In 1969 the "anonymous Czech photographer" was awarded the Overseas Press Club's Robert Capa Gold Medal for photographs requiring exceptional courage. Many of his photographs of these events were not seen until decades later.

With Magnum to recommend him to the British authorities, Koudelka applied for a three-month working visa and fled to England in 1970, where he applied for political asylum and stayed for more than a decade. In 1971 he joined Magnum as an Associate Member and became a Full Member in 1974. He continued to wander around Europe with his camera and little else.

Throughout the 1970s and 1980s, Koudelka sustained his work through numerous grants and awards, and continued to exhibit and publish major projects like Gypsies (1975) and Exiles (1988). Sean O'Hagan, writing in The Observer in 2011, described Gypsies as "a classic of documentary photography". Since 1986, he has worked with a panoramic camera and issued a compilation of these photographs in his book Chaos in 1999. Koudelka has had many other books of his work published, including in 2006 the retrospective volume Koudelka.

He and his work received support and acknowledgment from his friend the French photographer Henri Cartier-Bresson. He was also supported by the Czech art historian Anna Farova.

In 1987, Koudelka became a French citizen, and was able to return to Czechoslovakia for the first time, in 1990. He then produced Black Triangle, documenting the wasted landscape in the Podkrušnohoří region, the western tip of the Black Triangle's foothills of the Ore Mountains, located between Germany and the Czech Republic.

Koudelka lives in France and Prague and is continuing his work documenting the European landscape. 
He is the father of two daughters, one who lives in England and the other in France, Lucina Hartley Koudelka, and of a son living in Italy, Nicola Koudelka.

Work
Koudelka's early work significantly shaped his later photography, and its emphasis on social and cultural rituals as well as death. He soon moved on to a more personal, in depth photographic study of the Gypsies of Slovakia, and later Romania. This work was exhibited in Prague in 1967.  Throughout his career, Koudelka has been praised for his ability to capture the presence of the human spirit amidst dark landscapes. Desolation, waste, departure, despair and alienation are common themes in his work. His characters sometimes seem to come out of fairytales. Still, some see hope within his work – the endurance of human endeavor, in spite of its fragility. His later work focuses on the landscape removed of human subjects.

His most recent book Wall: Israeli and Palestinian Landscapes was published by Aperture Foundation in 2013. This book is composed of panoramic landscapes that he made between 2008 and 2012, as his project for the photography collective This Place, organized by photographer Frédéric Brenner. A documentary about Koudelka's work there, called Koudelka Shooting Holy Land, was released in 2015.

Publications
Diskutujeme o morálce dneška. Czechoslovakia: Nakladatelství Politické Literatury, 1965.
Kral Ubu: Rozbor inscenace Divadla Na Zábradlí v Praze (with Alfred Jarry). Czechoslovakia: Divadelní Ústav, 1966.
 Rozbor insenace Divadla Na zábradlí v Praze, 1966.
 Josef Koudelka, 1968.
Gitans = Gypsies
Gitans: la fin du voyage. Paris: Delpire, 1975. ASIN B0014M0TV8.
Gypsies. New York: Aperture, 1975. .
Gypsies. New York: Aperture, 2011. Revised and enlarged edition. . With an essay by Will Guy.
Roma. Göttingen: Steidl, 2011. . German language edition.
Josef Koudelka: I Grandi Fotografi. Italy: Fabbri, 1982.
Josef Koudelka. Photo Poche, Centre National de la Photographie, France, 1984.
 Josef Koudelka. Photographs by Josef Koudelka. Introduction by Bernard Cuau. Centre National de la Photographie, Paris, 1984.
 Exiles.
Paris: Centre National de la Photographie; Paris: Delpire; New York: Aperture; London: Thames & Hudson, 1988. .
Revised edition. Paris: Delpire; New York: Aperture, 1997.
Revised and expanded edition. London: Thames & Hudson; New York: Aperture, 2014. Essay by Czesław Miłosz. Commentary with Josef Koudelka and Robert Delpire.
Josef Koudelka, Mission Photographique Transmanche. France: Différence, 1989.
Animaux. France: Trois Cailloux/maison de la Culture d'Amiens, 1990.
 Prague 1968. France: Centre National de la Photographie, 1990.
Josef Koudelka: Fotografie Divadlo za branou 1965–1970. Czech Republic: Divadlo za Branou II, 1993.
 Josef Koudelka. Photographs by Josef Koudelka. Hasselblad Center, 1993.
Černý Trojúhelník – Podkrušnohoří : Fotografie 1990–1994 (The Black Triangle: The Foothills of the Ore Mountain). Czech Republic: Vesmír, 1994.
Photopoche: Josef Koudleka. France: Cnp, 1997. .
Reconnaissance Wales. Cardiff, UK: Fotogallery/ National Museums and Galleries of Wales, 1998. .
Chaos. France: Nathan/Delpire; UK: Phaidon Press; Italy: Federico Motta Editore, 1999. .
Lime Stone. France: La Martinière, 2001.
Josef Koudelka. Czech Republic: Torst, 2002. .
Théâtre du Temps. France: Actes Sud. ; (Teatro del Tempo), Italy: Peliti Associati; Greece: Apeiron, 2003.
L'épreuve totalitaire. Paris: Delpire, 2004. With an essay by Jean-Pierre Montier.
Koudelka: Camargue. France: Actes Sud, 2006. .
Koudelka. France: Delpire; Italy: Contrasto; New York: Aperture; UK: Thames & Hudson; Germany: Braus; Spain: Lunwerg; Czech Republic: Fototorst, 2006.
Joseph Koudelka Photofile. Thames & Hudson, 2007. .
Invasion 68: Prague. New York: Aperture. ; France: Tana. , 2008.
Koudelka Piedmont. Contrasto, 2010. .
 Lime. Paris: Xavier Barral, 2012. .
 Wall. New York: Aperture, 2013. .

Awards
 1967: Award by Union of Czechoslovakian Artists, Czechoslovakia
 1969: Robert Capa Gold Medal Award, National Press Photographers Association, US, for his invasion photographs; the prize is dedicated to "an unknown Czech photographer"
 1972: British Arts Council Grant to cover Kendal and Southend, UK
 1973: British Arts Council Grant to cover Gypsy life in Britain, UK
 1976: Arts Council of Great Britain grant to cover life in the British Isles, UK
 1978 Prix Nadar, France
 1980: National Endowment for the Arts Council, US
 1987: Grand Prix National de la Photographie, French Ministry of Culture, France
 1989: Grand Prix National de la Photographie.
 1991: , France
 1992: Hasselblad Award, Sweden
 1998: The Royal Photographic Society's Centenary Medal and Honorary Fellowship (HonFRPS) in recognition of a sustained, significant contribution to the art of photography in 1998.
 2004: Cornell Capa Infinity Award, International Center of Photography, New York City
 2015: Dr. Erich Salomon Award

Exhibitions

1961 – Divadlo Semafor, Prague
1967 – Josef Koudela: Cikáni – 1961–1966, Divadlo za branou, Prague
1968 – Josef Koudela: Divadelní fotografie – 1965–1968, Divadlo za branou, Prague
1975 – Josef Koudelka, Museum of Modern Art, New York
1977 – Gitans: la fin du voyage, Galerie Delpire, Paris; Kunsthaus Zürich, Zürich, Switzerland; The Tel-Aviv Museum, Israel; Victoria and Albert Museum, London.
1978 – Stedelijk Museum Amsterdam, Amsterdam, Netherlands
1984 – Josef Koudelka, Hayward Gallery, London. An exhibition of the Prague invasion pictures, crediting Koudelka for the first time.
1988/89 – Josef Koudelka, Centre national de la photographie, Palais de Tokyo, Paris; International Center of Photography, New York; Akademie der Künste, Berlin; Museum Folkwang, Essen, Germany; IVAM, Valencia, Spain.
1989 – Josef Koudelka, Mission Transmanche, CRP Galerie de l'Ancienne Poste, Douchy-les-Mines, France
1990 – Josef Koudelka z Fotografického dila 1958–1990, Umeleckoprumyslové museum, Prague
1994 – Černý trojúhelník – Podkrušnohoří : Fotografie 1990–1994 = The Black Triangle : the foothills of the Ore mountains, Salmovsky Palac, Prague
1995/97 – Periplanissis: following Ulysses' Gaze, Mylos, Thessaloniki, Greece; Zappeion, Athens; Centre culturel Una Volta, Bastia, France; ville de Rodez, France; Tokyo Metropolitan Museum of Photography, Tokyo; Museo di Storia della Fotografia, Fratelli Alinari, Firenze, Italy.
1998 – Reconnaissance: Wales, National Museum and Gallery of Wales, Cardiff, UK
1998 – From Behind the Iron Curtain, Lyttleton foyer, Royal National Theatre, London
1999/2001 – Chaos, Palazzo delle Esposizioni, Rome; Cantieri Culturali della Zisa, Palermo, Italy; Palazzo Marino alla Scala, Milan; The Snellman Hall, Helsinki; sala de exposiciones de Plaza de España, Madrid.
2002 – Josef Koudelka: Fotograf, National Gallery, Prague
2002/03 – Rétrospective, Rencontres d'Arles, Arles, France; Museo del Palacio de Bellas Artes, Mexico City; Museo de Arte Contemporáneo de Monterrey, Monterrey, Mexico.
2003 – Teatro del Tempo, Mercati di Traiano, Rome
2006 – Rencontres d'Arles, Arles, France: exhibition and laureate of the Discovery Award
2008
Screening at Théâtre antique d'Orange, Rencontres d'Arles, Arles, France
Prague 1968, Aperture Gallery, New York
Koudelka, Benaki Museum, Athens
Josef Koudelka, Pera Museum, İstanbul
Invaze = Invasion, Old Town Hall, Prague
2010 – Invasion Prague 68, Photo Cube Market Square, Guernsey
2011 – Invasion 68 Prague, The Lumiere Brothers Center for Photography, Moscow
2012 – Zingari, Fondazione Forma, Milan
2013 – Vestiges 1991–2012, Centre de la Vieille Charité, Marseilles, France
2013/2014 – Josef Koudelka Retrospective, The National Museum of Modern Art, Tokyo
2014/2015 – Josef Koudelka: Nationality Doubtful, Art Institute of Chicago, Chicago, Illinois; Getty Center, Los Angeles; Fundacion Mapfre, Madrid
2016/2017 – "Exiles | Wall" Netherlands Photo Museum
2018 – Josef Koudelka: Returning, Museum of Decorative Arts, Prague
2019 – Josef Koudelka: Exiles, Sofia City Art Gallery, Sofia

Collections
Koudelka's work is held in the following permanent collections:
Stedelijk Museum Amsterdam, Amsterdam, Netherlands

See also
Josef Sudek

References

External links
 Koudelka at Magnum Photos
A look at the Josef Koudelka retrospective at the National Gallery's Trades Fair Palace in Prague, 2003
 Josef Koudelka: Contact Sheets

Interviews
 Interview with Frank Horvat (January 1987)
Praga '68 – la Primavera di Koudelka, La Domenica di Repubblica, article and interview about photographs of the Soviet invasion of Prague
Josef Koudelka in conversation with Shela Sheikh, about This Place project photographing Israel and the West Bank

1938 births
Living people
Magnum photographers
Czech photographers
Academy of Performing Arts in Prague alumni
Recipients of Medal of Merit (Czech Republic)
Czech Technical University in Prague alumni
Members of the Academy of Arts, Berlin